Samo (English: Only) is the debut studio album by the Croatian singer-songwriter Nina Kraljić. It was released on 30 September 2016 in Croatia, through Universal Music Austria. The album includes the singles "Zaljuljali smo svijet" and her Eurovision Song Contest 2016 entry, "Lighthouse".

Background
Work on Samo began in 2015. It features Nina's successful, characteristic musical expression. The album's release was intended to be much earlier, but the Eurovision Song Contest project prolonged the process. With this album, Nina presented herself as a songwriter and composer with the songs "Lay you down" and "Lullaby". Nina wrote ''Lullaby'' when she was 18 years old, dedicating the song to her late grand grandmother. The song ''Što te nema'' features the Croatian pianist Matija Dedić. Ata ey foshehu sham is written in Hebrew, Negdje is the Croatian version of the same song.

Singles
"Zaljuljali smo svijet" was released as the album's lead single and as Nina's debut single on June 30, 2015. "Lighthouse" was released as the album's second single released on March 9, 2016. It represented Croatia in the Eurovision Song Contest 2016. Samo was released on 30 September 2016 as a promotional single for the album.

Track listing

Charts

Release history

References

2016 debut albums
Nina Kraljić albums